Bob Howarth (20 June 1865 – 20 August 1938) was an English footballer. An England international, he was a member of the Preston North End side which became known as "The Invincibles".

Career
Bob Howarth was born in Preston. He joined Preston North End in 1883, and for eight years was a member of the North End side that earned the title of "The Invincibles". He was in the Preston side that were 1887-88 FA Cup Finalists. The following season, he was in the Preston side that did the double, being Football League Champions and 1888-89 FA Cup Winners. Bob Howarth made his League debut on 8 September 1888 at full-back for Preston North End against Burnley at Preston North End' Deepdale ground in Preston. Preston won 5–2. Bob Howarth played 18 of Preston' 22 League Championship matches and played in a defence-line that achieved nine clean-sheets.

In one source Bob Howarth was described as 'a powerful and formidable full-back".

In 1891 he joined Everton, before returning to finish his career back at Preston North End. He gained several representative honours, making four appearances for England. Outside of football he worked in Preston as a solicitor.

Professional baseball
Howarth played baseball professionally as an outfielder for Preston North End Baseball Club in the 1890 National League of Baseball of Great Britain, but spent much of the season with the amateur team.

References

External links

English footballers
Everton F.C. players
Preston North End F.C. players
England international footballers
1865 births
1938 deaths
English Football League representative players
Association football defenders
English Football League players
FA Cup Final players
English baseball players